Borda may refer to:

Qaṣīda al-Burda, a famous Sufi poem. 
Borda (building) or borde, traditional cattle farmers' buildings in the Pyrenees, a barn, sheepfold, or stable
 Places in India
 Borda, Goa, a town and suburb of the city of Margao in the state of Goa, India
 Borda, Maharashtra, a village in Osmanabad district of Maharashtra State, India
 Borda, Bhopal, a village in Madhya Pradesh, India
Borda da Mata, a municipality in Minas Gerais, Brazil
Borda, the Hungarian name for Burda village, Budureasa Commune, Bihor County, Romania
Borda (crater), a lunar crater
Borda (legendary creature), in the culture of the Emilia-Romagna of the Po Valley, Italy
Borda count, a single-winner election method
Borda–Carnot equation in fluid dynamics
BORDA, Bremen Overseas Research and Development Association
House of Borda, family name of a French-Spanish noble house

People
Aritz Borda, a Spanish footballer 
Deborah Borda, an American orchestra executive
Jean-Charles de Borda (1733–1799), a French mathematician, physicist, political scientist, and sailor
Lidia Borda, an Argentinian tango singer
Soleil Borda, an American teen actress
Arturo Borda (1883–1953), a Bolivian surrealist painter

Ships
French ship Borda, six different French naval ships named Borda

See also
Bourda, a cricket ground in Georgetown, Guyana